Vicky (Vicki) Stuiber Slane is an international level competitor in Taekwondo. She competed in the 1993 World Taekwondo Championships where she earned a bronze medal. Additionally she competed in the 1993 US Olympic festival where she placed second.

References

Living people
American female taekwondo practitioners
World Taekwondo Championships medalists
Year of birth missing (living people)
20th-century American women